Tommotia is a small shelly fossil from the Early Cambrian Period.  Originally, only a cone-shaped shell was recognized, which was originally thought to be an early cephalopod, with either squid-like tentacles or a snail-like foot.  More recent investigation has shown that the cone is not the remains of a complete animal, but a sclerite of a larger, soft-bodied animal that would have resembled a chiton or a sea mouse.  The fossils called Camanella may be another type of sclerite from the same animal.

References

External links
 The Tommotian Age of the Early Cambrian Epoch

Cambrian animals of Asia
Enigmatic animal taxa

Fossil taxa described in 1966

Cambrian genus extinctions